VECC may refer to:

 Variable Energy Cyclotron Centre, a research and development unit of the Indian Department of Atomic Energy
 Netaji Subhas Chandra Bose International Airport (ICAO code: VECC), formerly known as Dum Dum Airport, in Kolkata, India